Martin Dingle-Wall is an Australian actor, producer and screenwriter. He originated the role of Flynn Saunders on the Australian soap opera Home and Away in 2001. He departed the show in 2002. Dingle-Wall has appeared in Satisfaction, Underbelly: A Tale of Two Cities and Cops: L.A.C.

Career

For his portrayal of Flynn Saunders in Home and Away, Dingle-Wall received a nomination for the Logie Award for Most Popular New Male Talent.

In 2003, he appeared on stage as Kip Polson in an adaptation of the screenplay The Nothing Men. He was picked for the Peugeot 307 SV campaign in 2004. Later in 2004, he took a part in a short movie for the BBC, Out of Water, playing the lead.

In 2005, appeared as Scott Allen in the television drama film Summer Solstice, directed by Giles Foster, playing alongside Jacqueline Bisset, Honor Blackman, Jason Durr and Sinéad Cusack.

In 2007, he appeared as Johnny Lake in and episode of the television series Satisfaction.

In 2007/8, he also filmed the comedy feature film The Makeover, playing the lead Roger Keaton.

He has also written two screenplays: Heart of a Nation and Pariah; both were taken up by an (unnamed) production house in the UK with Shepperton and Pinewood Studios.

In 2007/8, he also filmed the movie version of The Nothing Men for which he was also a producer through his company Alchemy Film Productions P/L., via which they became a global industry headline for pioneering the revolutionary RED digital cinema camera in the Southern Hemisphere, second in the world to only Steven Soderbergh's Che.

In 2008/9, he was cast as the younger brother Les Kane of the notorious Kane Brother's, bosses of the Painters & Dockers for the Underbelly prequel Underbelly: A Tale of Two Cities.

In 2010, he appeared alongside Kate Ritchie for a third time in Cops: L.A.C.

Dingle-Wall went to Los Angeles in 2012 to play the title role of Matthew Butticker, Defense Attorney in the Award Winning play ANACONDA for the Hollywood Fringe Festival. It went on to win the Festival & be nominated as Top 10 Theatre Productions that year by the GLAAD Awards.

He relocated to Los Angeles in 2013 & booked a major commercial campaign for NISSAN cast as the Hero by Director Joseph Kosinski (Oblivion, TRON-LEGACY).

Dingle-Wall booked the support role of Neil McPherson in the film Strangerland with Nicole Kidman and Joseph Fiennes, directed by Kim Farrant.

Soon after, he booked the romantic lead in the Feature Film "All that Jam" shot on location in Russia, for which he learned Russian and played almost the entire film in that language. His support cast included Chris Owen, (Sherminator from the American Pie Franchise) and Svetlana Khodchenkova (Viper from Wolverine).

Dingle-Wall then booked the lead role in Happy Hunting (2016 film), shot in America in the Californian desert, Directed by Joe Dietsch & Louie Gibson. It had its American Premier at Screamfest where it won BEST CINEMATOGRAPHY. It is heavily engaged in the 2017 Festival Circuit both domestically and abroad.

He joined the cast of Salty, alongside Antonio Banderas and Olga Kurylenko in July 2016.

In 2021, Dingle-Wall played the lead role of Will Scott in the Egyptian-American TV series, Cypher.

Personal life
He has a brother and sister, Jamie & Sally. Dingle-Wall grew up on the coast of Bondi.

In October 2016, Dingle-Wall revealed that shortly after relocating to Los Angeles in 2012, he began receiving treatment from Alcoholics Anonymous. The actor told Jonathon Moran of The Daily Telegraph that he decided to attend AA because he did not like the personality changes he suffered as a result of consuming alcohol.

Filmography

References

External links
 
 
his Production company
 The Nothing Men Movie web site
Out of Water at BBC Online

21st-century Australian male actors
Male actors from Sydney
Australian male film actors
Australian film producers
Australian male soap opera actors
Australian screenwriters
Australian male stage actors
Living people
Writers from Sydney
Year of birth missing (living people)
21st-century Australian screenwriters